Vintage base ball is baseball presented as if being played by rules and customs from an earlier period in the sport's history. Games are typically played using rules and uniforms from the 19th century. Vintage base ball is not only a competitive game, but also a reenactment of baseball life similar to American Civil War reenactment. Players dress in uniforms appropriate to the time period, and  many teams appear to be direct copies of teams that existed in the late 19th century. The styles and speech of the 19th century are also used while playing vintage base ball.

The game's name is typically written "base ball" rather than "baseball", as that was the spelling used before the 1880s.

Rules and game play 
Although rules differ according to which playing year is being used, there are some mostly common rules differences between the modern game and vintage base ball. In rules of years prior to the 1880s, the pitcher's role was to initiate the action by offering an underhanded throw to the batter, or "striker", in much the same way that a basketball referee offers up a jump ball to begin play. Since this type of pitching often caused the batter to hit lazy, foul pop-ups, catchers played their position approximately twenty to twenty-five feet behind the batter, and wore no protective equipment. There are typically no fences as base ball is mostly played in fields and green spaces.  However, obstacles (e.g. trees, building, etc.) often come into play.  In many of the rules sets the ball can be played off of one bounce to get a striker out.  Catching the ball can be very difficult because no gloves are used. The lack of gloves, underhand pitching and other rules make vintage base ball similar to the sport of Welsh baseball.

Women playing base ball
Women competing against each other in base ball dates back to at least 1875 when the first female professional baseball players were recruited to play on teams according to their hair color.  The "National Amusement Association", created by Illinois businessman Frank Myers, advertised the novelty of women playing baseball and promoted the sport as family entertainment, suitable for women and children. To garner interest, he divided the teams into "blondes" and "brunettes". Myers's attempt to profit from the novelty event failed in less than a year, but the concept of women playing baseball, divided into teams of blondes and brunettes, continued well into the 20th century as a popular event to stage at picnics and fairs.

See also
 Blonde versus brunette rivalry
 Doc Adams
 Origins of baseball
 Vintage Base Ball Association
 Vintage Base Ball Federation

References

External links

 Friends of Vintage Base Ball

Baseball genres
Reenactment of the late modern period